The term Department of Information may refer to the following:
Department of Information (Australia)
Department of Information (United Kingdom)

See also
Ministry of Information